Kulla Kulli is a 1980 Indian Kannada-language film, directed by H. R. Bhargava and produced by Dwarakish. The film stars Dwarakish, Jayachitra, Balakrishna and Tiger Prabhakar. The film has musical score by Rajan–Nagendra.

Cast

Dwarakish
Jayachitra
Balakrishna
Tiger Prabhakar
Sundar Krishna Urs
Leelavathi
Thoogudeepa Srinivas in Guest appearance
Uma Shivakumar in Guest appearance
Halam
Baby Rekha
Sudha Rani (credited as Baby Jayashree)
Lakshman
Master Rajesh
Chethan Ramarao

Soundtrack
The music was composed by Rajan–Nagendra.

References

External links
 
 

1980 films
1980s Kannada-language films
Films scored by Rajan–Nagendra